The Daniel R. Wright House, also known as the Murphy-Dunlap House, is a historic house in Eutaw, Alabama.  The one-story wood-frame house was built in 1847.  It is built in the Greek Revival style, with a raised pier brick foundation.  A one-story L-shaped porch spans the full width of the east and south facades.  It was added to the National Register of Historic Places as part of the Antebellum Homes in Eutaw Thematic Resource on April 2, 1982.

References

National Register of Historic Places in Greene County, Alabama
Houses on the National Register of Historic Places in Alabama
Houses in Greene County, Alabama
Houses completed in 1847
Greek Revival houses in Alabama
1847 establishments in Alabama